Akash Mahal is a 2019 Bangladeshi folk fantasy film directed by Delwar Jahan Jhantu. It feature Emon and Airin Sultana in the lead roles. The film marked as 75th directorial venture of Delwar Jahan Jhantu.

Cast 
 Emon
 Airin Sultana
Danny Sidak

Release 
The film released in theatre on August 2, 2019.

References

External links 
 

2019 films
Bengali-language Bangladeshi films
2010s Bengali-language films